José Voltaire Villafuerte Tenorio (born 27 November 1956) is an Ecuadorian retired footballer.

Club career
Villafuerte spent almost his entire career with El Nacional through the 1970s and 1980s, winning 7 championships in 10 years. During this period he was also a key player for Ecuador, though the national side saw little success in the World Cup qualifiers and the Copa America this period.

Villafuerte was known for his vision, ball control and scoring record from midfield (including league top scorer in 1982). He remains one of the domestic league's all-time top 10 scorers.

International career
He made 42 appearances for the Ecuador national football team from 1976 to 1985.

References

External links

1956 births
Living people
Sportspeople from Esmeraldas, Ecuador
Association football midfielders
Ecuadorian footballers
Ecuador international footballers
C.D. El Nacional footballers
Delfín S.C. managers
C.D. El Nacional managers